The Beloften Eredivisie ("Promised Honor Division") was the highest football league in for reserve teams in the Netherlands organized by the Royal Dutch Football Association (KNVB). The league was founded in 1992 as Reserve Teams Eredivisie and this name was in use until the 2000–01 season. The second teams are called beloften teams.

Until the 2009–10 season the league champion, as well as the KNVB Reserve Cup winner, was awarded a ticket for the regular KNVB Cup but the reserve teams were disbanded from the KNVB Cup. A Super Cup was installed instead. There was no promotion and the team finishing at the bottom of the table was relegated to the Beloften Eerste Divisie. The competition was a stand-alone competition and was not incorporated in the Dutch professional or amateur league structure. In recent years there was less interest in the competitions. A lot of teams merged their youth programs and brought joined team into the beloften leagues. The 2012–13 season also saw a big change to the format: the best 3 teams of that season were allowed to promote to the Eerste Divisie. As a result, the reserve teams of PSV Eindhoven, Ajax and FC Twente left the Beloften Eredivisie and played in the aforementioned Eerste Divisie.

The Beloften Eredivisie was dissolved in 2016. The 11 teams that competed in the 2015–16 season were integrated into the league pyramid and assigned to three leagues below the Eredivisie based on points, as indicated in the table below.

1 Formerly Brabant United.
2 Since the three best clubs were preferred for Saturday, Achilles was assigned to play on Sunday.
 
Key

Champions
 1992 SC Heerenveen 2
 1993 Vitesse 2
 1994 Ajax 2
 1995 Sparta Rotterdam 2
 1996 Ajax 2
 1997 PSV 2
 1998 Ajax 2
 1999 De Graafschap 2
 2000 PSV 2
 2001 Ajax 2
 2002 Jong Ajax
 2003 Jong SC Heerenveen
 2004 Jong Ajax
 2005 Jong Ajax
 2006 Jong AZ
 2007 Jong SC Heerenveen
 2008 Jong FC Twente
 2009 Jong Ajax
 2010 Jong PSV
 2011 Jong PSV
 2012 Jong FC Twente
 2013 Jong SC Heerenveen
 2014 Jong Feyenoord/Excelsior
 2015 Jong Vitesse
 2016 Jong FC Utrecht

Sports leagues established in 1992
Sports leagues disestablished in 2016
Neth
Defunct football leagues in the Netherlands
1992 establishments in the Netherlands
2016 disestablishments in the Netherlands